General Fick may refer to:

Eric Fick (fl. 1900s–2020s), U.S. Air Force lieutenant general 
Ernst Otto Fick (1898–1945), German Waffen-SS major general
Kathleen E. Fick (fl. 1970s–2010s), U.S. Air Force major general